Atomic Train is a 1999 American made-for-television disaster-action-thriller miniseries about an accidental nuclear explosion destroying the city of Denver. It was originally broadcast on NBC in two parts on May 16 and 17, 1999.

Plot
The film starts in Dallas when a school bus full of children, including the teacher, was nearly struck by an oncoming freight train, which the only damage done by the train was the rear door.

In Colorado, Bradshaw Disposal Services has a nuclear bomb made in Russia to transport, and an employee (named Henry Bradshaw) decides to save money by concealing it on a freight train. This train is also loaded with hazardous and flammable chemicals, including metallic sodium, which spontaneously ignites on contact with water. The train suffers a brake failure and becomes a runaway heading for Denver. John Seger, a National Transportation Safety Board (NTSB) investigator, boards the train and with the assistance of the railwaymen tries various ways to stop the train. Several ideas are tried, such as coupling a following train to the caboose (the coupling mechanism on the caboose breaks, which also results in the death of one of the train's crew members), a derailing attempt (after it is revealed, the catastrophe that the chemicals would cause if ignited) in which a helicopter narrowly avoids being hit, and finally, an attempt at manually activating the brakes (via hitting a part of the engine mechanism with a wrench). The final attempt works successfully but is short-lived. The following rescue train, unaware of the freight's slowing, speeds forward and crushes the caboose (killing an injured crew member in the process). The force disengages the brakes, this time for good, causing the train to speed up once again. Meanwhile, Denver residents are struggling to collect their families and then leave town, despite rioters, looters, and gridlock. Realizing that there is no way to stop it, John and the engineer (who was initially reluctant) abandon the train by jumping off before it can speed up too much.

The train derails and becomes a terrific wreck. Discovering the now highly unstable bomb on board, firefighters struggle to extinguish the fire at the crash site. After realizing that metallic sodium is on the train, the firefighters and NEST teams retreat to evaluate a strategy. In the meantime, all firefighting aircraft are grounded. The misinterpretation of a radio call to a water bombing helicopter leads it to dump its load of water onto the wreck. Water comes into contact with the metallic sodium, which explodes and in turn causes the nuclear bomb to detonate. The blast causes severe damage throughout Denver and releases an electromagnetic pulse. No cars work, electricity is out and anything with a computer is shut down.

After the blast, Denver lies in ruins. John (who made it back to town via helicopter) then attempts to get his family out of Denver before nuclear fallout starts, but is separated again from Megan and their family as Noris takes his son and Grace Seger through the mines for a quicker route towards Eminence, while the bus heading for Kansas has just departed, taking Megan and Grace's boyfriend Danny away, leaving John on his own. He eventually finds a working car and then reunites with his family at a FEMA refugee camp in Eminence, Kansas.

Rail equipment 
The release poster features FM C-liners, of which one exists today, Canadian Pacific 4104 at Nelson British Columbia.

The actual film uses all Canadian equipment, including the MLW M-420. The two locomotives that attempt to couple to the runaway are in the paint scheme of BC Rail, which has since been folded into Canadian National.

Cast
 Rob Lowe as John Seger
 Kristin Davis as Megan Seger
 Esai Morales as Noris "Mac" MacKenzie
 John Finn as Wally Phister
 Mena Suvari as Grace Seger
 Edward Herrmann as President Fellwick

Awards
Won the Golden Reel Award (2000) for "Best Sound Editing - Television Mini-Series - Effects and Foley"
Nominated for Golden Reel Award (2000) for "Best Sound Editing - Television Mini-Series - Dialogue and ADR"

Home media release
Trimark Home Video (under the label NBC Home Video) released the film in DVD and VHS on September 21, 1999.

See also
 List of disaster films
 Unstoppable (2010 film)

References

External links

Nuclear Information and Resource Service: "NBC's 'Atomic Train" Explodes Myth of Safe Nuclear Waste Transport"

1999 television films
1999 films
1990s American television miniseries
1990s disaster films
1990s thriller drama films
NBC network original films
American disaster films
American thriller drama films
Disaster television films
Action television films
Films about families
Films about nuclear war and weapons
Films set on trains
Films shot in Vancouver
Rail transport films
American thriller television films
Trimark Pictures films
Films set in Colorado
Films directed by Dick Lowry
Films scored by Lee Holdridge
Films about fictional presidents of the United States
Films directed by David Jackson (director)
American drama television films
1990s American films